Minibond is a brand name for a series of structured financial notes issued in Hong Kong and Singapore under the control of Lehman Brothers.

The term "Minibond" is also used to refer to other likewise structured Notes, namely Constellation Notes and Octave Notes, respectively issued in Hong Kong under the direction of DBS Bank and Morgan Stanley. These Notes, coupled with Minibonds (and other Equity-linked Notes issued by Lehman Brothers) are sometimes officially referred to as "Lehman-related securities".

Lehman Brothers arranged 3 "Special Purpose Entities" (hereafter "SPE") to issue Minibond-like Notes in Hong Kong from 2002 to 2008. Minibonds are issued by Pacific International Finance Limited, and the Notes issued by the other 2 SPE are branded "ProFund Notes" and "Pyxis Notes". Unlike the Minibonds (which have a three-layered structure), these latter Notes feature 2 layers of notes bundled.

See also 
 Credit
 Credit derivative
 Credit derivative risks
 Default Risk
 CLN
 CDO

References

Commercial bonds